Noel Larkin (born 6 January 1955, in Athlone) is an Irish former footballer who played for Athlone Town, Shamrock Rovers and Derry City.

Biography
Noel made his League of Ireland debut in 1971 at Tolka Park against Shelbourne as a left back. His versatility was a major plus for his hometown club as in his thirteen years at St Mel's Park he played in every outfield position.

Noel won the League of Ireland twice and the League of Ireland Cup three times with his home club. He also represented the club in the European Cup and memorably in the UEFA Cup against AC Milan in 1975. Noel describes his experience of playing at the famed San Siro:

"It was some experience," said Noel, who was only 19 at the time. "The San Siro was full and it was very frightening. We walked out on the pitch before the game and loads of flares started shooting down from the stands. We had never come across this type of fanaticism before. It was a bit scary. We had also received lots of bad press from the Italian media because they felt we kicked their players too hard in Athlone. So there was quite a bit of bad feeling toward us. The fact our jerseys were the same colour as Inter Milan, their biggest rivals, seemed to annoy them even more!

"We played exceptionally well though and held them scoreless for most of the game. I think we conceded three in the last 20 minutes or so. We just caved in a bit. I played in the middle of midfield that night and marked Gianni Rivera, he was Italy's World Cup captain and was making his Milan return that night. That's why there was so many people in the stadium. He is a Milan legend. He came up to me after the game and told me I played well. That was nice and I'll never forget it."

He finished the 1982/83 season as top goalscorer with 18 league goals which won him the Personality of the Year award.

Noel joined Rovers in November 1984 having decided to retire a few weeks before only for a phone call from Jim McLaughlin (football manager) which changed his mind. He made his debut on 18 November in a 2–0 win over Home Farm. Two weeks later he scored on his home debut at Milltown in a 4–0 hammering of St. Pats. He went on to score 11 goals (8 league and 3 FAI Cup) that season as Rovers won the double. The best remembered was his winning goal in the Cup Final win against Galway United.

In the 1985/86 season he scored 13 goals in all competitions as Rovers again won the double with Noel scoring a memorable header in Rovers 1–0 win over Arsenal. In the 1986/87 season Noel scored a total of seventeen goals in all competitions as Rovers completed a treble double. He also scored for the League of Ireland in a 2–1 defeat to the Irish League on St Patrick's Day. The following night Rovers played Manchester United and Noel played and scored with a diving header as Rovers notched up their second victory over their glamorous opponents in the same season.

Again Noel scored in the Cup Final with a great 20-yard drive. Despite interest from AS Monaco. Noel stayed with Rovers.

The following season was a disaster for the club as Glenmalure Park was put up for sale and the owners moved home games to Tolka Park. As Rovers fans boycotted "home" games Noel's form seemed to suffer as he scored just 11 goals in all competitions. However these included a hat trick of headers against Bohemians at Dalymount Park. His last game in the green and white was on 8 April 1988 at a near empty Tolka.

In total he played in six European games for the Hoops scoring 34 League goals and 12 in the FAI Cup.

He then joined Derry City where he scored twice on his debut and in his one season there he won the domestic treble. Fittingly in his last game in the League of Ireland he won another Cup medal to bring his total career haul to 15 major trophies, 6 Leagues, 4 FAI Cups, 4 League Cups and 1 Tyler All Ireland Cup as well as other minor medals such as Presidents Cup and Leinster Senior Cup medals. He made over 500 league of Ireland appearances.

Noel then emigrated to Australia and played for Spearwood Dalmatinac and Stirling Macedonia, winning another League and Cup double before retiring at 38 then coaching until 1998. He currently resides in Brisbane.

He also represented the Irish Olympic side 8 times in the 1988 Summer Olympics qualifiers, scoring in a 2–2 draw with Spain and in a 1–1 draw in France where he captained the team.

References

Sources
 The Hoops by Paul Doolan and Robert Goggins

Association football forwards
Republic of Ireland association footballers
League of Ireland players
Athlone Town A.F.C. players
Shamrock Rovers F.C. players
Derry City F.C. players
1955 births
Living people
People from Athlone
League of Ireland XI players
Sportspeople from County Westmeath
Stirling Macedonia FC players